"Bell Bottom Blues" may refer to:

 "Bell Bottom Blues" (Carr/David song), 1953 song popularized by Teresa Brewer in the United States and Alma Cogan in the United Kingdom
 "Bell Bottom Blues" (Derek and the Dominos song), 1970 song written by Eric Clapton and Bobby Whitlock, and popularized by his band Derek and the Dominos